Nubian M.O.B. is the only album of a contemporary R&B group of the same name, which was released during 1992 on Cold Chillin' Records. It was produced entirely by Daddy-O of the group Stetsasonic.

Executive Producers were Kedar Massenburg, Tyrone Williams, and Leonard Richardson.

Tracklisting
Hey, Y'all (The M.O.B.'s All Here) (5:50)
In the Light (5:20)
Vocals Melt (Right Into The Tracks) (3:34)
Far Away to Go (5:12)
Why Play (5:36)
Candidrops (5:27)
Things in Smash (5:41)
Domino (4:44)
Mind to Mind (5:35)
The Power of the Pen (5:37)

East Coast hip hop albums
1992 debut albums
Cold Chillin' Records albums